is a Japanese illustrator of yaoi (boys love) manga. Her major works include Desire (written by Maki Kazumi), Sweet Revolution, Rin! (written by Satoru Kannagi), Can't Win With You!, Constellations in My Palm, Stolen Heart, and Thirsty for Love.

External links

 Yukine Honami manga at Media Arts Database 

Women manga artists
Manga artists
Living people
Year of birth missing (living people)